The Ferrovie dello Stato Italiane (FS; Italian State Railways) Class 746 (Italian: Gruppo 746) is a class of 2-8-2 'Mikado' steam locomotive. These were the biggest locomotives ever built by the Ferrovie dello Stato, even though not the fastest, which were the Class 691s.

Design and construction
The Class 746 originated from the need of a fast locomotive that, while having similar performance to the 'Pacific' Class 690, could have a lower axle load and therefore wider route availability; this could be achieved by adding another driving axle, and accepting a lower top speed (reverting to a leading Italian bogie). To achieve high performance, it was decided to adopt a symmetric compound engine (a Von Borries design), with the two inside high pressure (HP) cylinders having the motion for their valves derived from the outside Walschaerts valve gear; this was unusual for Italian locomotive practice, where the compound engine had been shelved once the superheating technology had become available in the 1910s.

Forty locomotives were ordered to the Ernesto Breda, which produced them in 1922, and then ten more in 1926; Gio. Ansaldo & C. built ten more, fitted with Caprotti valve gear, in the same years. The latter were initially classified as Class 747, but in 1930 they were reclassified as the 746.100-110 subclass.

Operations and modifications
The Class 746 initially operated on the Milan-Bologna-Florence-Rome-Naples main line; after portions of it were electrified, they served on the Milan-Turin and the Milan-Brescia railways. In the 1960s, they were operating in Sicily and on the Adriatic coast railway (based at Ancona shed), until their withdrawals, which were concluded by 1967. While fast, powerful and suitable for both fast passenger and goods trains, the Class 746 proved difficult to start and somewhat uneasy when running at or close to its top speed (with both problems originating from its compound engine); also, at higher speeds the low-pressure cylinders contributed relatively little to the locomotive's power output. The locomotives fitted with Caprotti valve gear also turned out to have problems when functioning in reverse. Their poor riding qualities and their huge mass (for Italian standards) led some Milanese crews to nickname them "Krassin".

In 1930, all the locomotives were modified with improved draughting. In 1932, four locomotives, two with Walschaerts valve gear (the 746.007 and the 046) and two with Caprotti valve gear (the 746.107 and the 108), were modified with a simple-expansion engine; while results were very encouraging, with the modified locomotives being as performant as the unmodified ones but performing better at higher speeds, the widespread electrification meant that this experiment was not followed up with more conversions.

Preservation
Two Class 746 locomotives survive into preservation: the 746.031, a static exhibit in the Museo della Scienza e della Tecnologia "Leonardo da Vinci" in Milano, and the 746.038, long preserved in the FS workshop of Verona and recently moved to Pistoia, to await a possible restoration.

Notes

References

 
 
 

746
2-8-2 locomotives
Compound locomotives
Gio. Ansaldo & C. locomotives
Breda locomotives
Railway locomotives introduced in 1923
Standard gauge locomotives of Italy
1′D1′ h4v locomotives